Afrikanetz is a genus of moths in the family Cossidae.

Species
 Afrikanetz bugvan Yakovlev, 2009
 Afrikanetz inkubu Yakovlev, 2009
 Afrikanetz makumazan Yakovlev, 2009

References

 , 2009: New taxa of African and Asian Cossidae (Lepidoptera). Euroasian Entomological Journal 8 (3): 353–361. Full article: .

External links

Natural History Museum Lepidoptera generic names catalog

Cossinae
Moth genera